Qore may refer to:

Qore, a monarch of the Kingdom of Kush
Qore (PlayStation Network), an interactive online magazine for the PlayStation Network
Qore (programming language), an embeddable multithreaded programming language